Eshtehard is a city in the Central District of Eshtehard County, Alborz province, Iran and serves as capital of the county. At the time of the National Census of 2006, the population was 16,988 in 4,813 households, at which time it was a city in Karaj County, Tehran province. At the most recent census of 2016, the population was 29,993 in 9,357 households, by which time it had become the capital of Eshtehard County in the new Alborz province.

Main attractions include the Industrial Park of Eshtehard and the University of Payame Nur—Eshtehard Unit.

The majority of the people of Eshtehard belong to the Tat and Azerbaijani ethnic group and they speak the Tati language and Azerbaijani.

References 

Eshtehard County

Cities in Alborz Province

Populated places in Alborz Province

Populated places in Eshtehard County